Ezker Anitza (EzAn–IU, literally "Plural Left") is the Basque federation of United Left. The party was established in January 2012 after United Left–Greens (EB–B) was disenfranchised as IU's referent in the Basque Country. Isabel Salud is the current General Coordinator.

The Communist Party of Euskadi (EPK-PCE, Basque federation of PCE) is the major member of the coalition.

Electoral performance

Basque Parliament

References

External links
 

2012 establishments in Spain
Basque Country
Political parties established in 2012
Socialist parties in the Basque Country (autonomous community)